Mohammed Ellias is a Bangladeshi politician and the incumbent Member of Bangladesh Parliament from Cox's Bazar-1.

Early life
Ellias was born on 18 October 1963. He completed his education in a Madrassah.

Career
Ellias was elected to Parliament from Cox's Bazar-1 as a Jatiya Party candidate in 2014.

References

Living people
10th Jatiya Sangsad members
1963 births
Jatiya Party politicians